Alchemy Stars (白夜極光, "White Night Aurora") is a free-to-play tactical role-playing mobile game developed by Tourdog Studio and published by Tencent Games. It was released globally on 17 June 2021 for Android and iOS devices.

Gameplay 

In the game, players build teams of five characters ("Aurorians"), each associated with one of four elements. In the turn-based combat stages, players guide these characters along paths of as many connected tiles of the same element as possible. Depending on the path length, the characters' attack powers and range can increase. Characters can also activate abilities to influence the battlefield before taking their turn, including changing tile elements, teleporting or healing. Most stages are won when the player successfully eliminates all enemies within a set number of turns. However, some stages' objectives may be different, such as surviving a set number of turns against an endless wave of enemies, or creating a path to a specific tile to exit the map.

Outside of combat, players can build up their base and interact with or level up their characters. On the Colossus, players can increase their affinity with individual Aurorians or gather materials to use to upgrade their stats. In Cloud Gardens, players take control of their Navigator himself on a small, fully 3D map, and can collect materials through minigames such as fishing, chopping wood, and collecting ore to build up their own base.

Plot 
Alchemy Stars takes place in Astra, a world different from our own, inhabited by people known as Aurorians who are constantly fighting against evil beings called Eclipsites. Another group, known as the Caelestites, had special abilities that let them fly gigantic sentient airships known as Colossus and had psychic abilities to let them connect with each other. However, one day, a Caelestite named Schummer sold out her home to the Eclipsites in exchange for power, leading nearly all the Caelestites to be massacred. 

Players take on the role of the Navigator (named by the player in-game), a survivor of the Caelestite race who has spent roughly 17 years hiding from the Eclipsites in a Colossus named Soroz. When an Aurorian named Vice and her two comrades stumble across the Colossus while fighting off Eclipsites, the Navigator uses his power to help Vice defeat the enemies, and soon finds himself thrust into the middle of a war against the Eclipsites involving several factions of Aurorians with different agendas.

Development 
The music for the game was mainly composed by Asami Tachibana. The theme song, "White Midnight" (白夜), was written and performed by the Japanese singer Reol. The game surpassed one million pre-registrations ahead of its release. The game was released in both Japanese and English versions on 17 June 2021.

The global launch of Alchemy Stars was promoted by a giveaway of access to the Crunchyroll anime website and other prizes. Tencent Games also organized an illustration contest on Pixiv, commissioning Shoko Nakagawa and other artists to support the competition.

Reception 
Hardcore Droid praised Alchemy Star's gameplay and story, but noted that players may find both monotonous. The game surpassed 10 million downloads as of September 2021.

Notes

References

External links 
 Official website

Tactical role-playing video games
Android (operating system) games
IOS games
Gacha games
2021 video games
Fantasy video games
Video games developed in China
Tencent software